In statistics, particularly in hypothesis testing, the Hotelling's T-squared distribution (T2), proposed by Harold Hotelling, is a multivariate probability distribution that is tightly related to the F-distribution and is most notable for arising as the distribution of a set of sample statistics that are natural generalizations of the statistics underlying the Student's t-distribution.
The Hotelling's t-squared statistic (t2) is a generalization of Student's t-statistic that is used in multivariate hypothesis testing.

Motivation
The distribution arises in multivariate statistics in undertaking tests of the differences between the (multivariate) means of different populations, where tests for univariate problems would make use of a t-test.
The distribution is named for Harold Hotelling, who developed it as a generalization of Student's t-distribution.

Definition

Furthermore, if a random variable X has Hotelling's T-squared distribution, then:

where  is the F-distribution with parameters p and m−p+1.

Hotelling t-squared statistic

Let  be the sample covariance:

 

where we denote transpose by an apostrophe. It can be shown that  is a positive (semi) definite matrix and  follows a p-variate Wishart distribution with n−1 degrees of freedom. 
The sample covariance matrix of the mean reads .

The Hotelling's t-squared statistic is then defined as:

 

Because of this, one should expect the statistic to assume low values if , and high values if they are different.

From the distribution,

where  is the F-distribution with parameters p and n − p. 

In order to calculate a p-value (unrelated to p variable here), note that the distribution of  equivalently implies that 

Then, use the quantity on the left hand side to evaluate the p-value corresponding to the sample, which comes from the F-distribution. A confidence region may also be determined using similar logic.

Motivation  

Let  denote a p-variate normal distribution with location  and known covariance . Let

be n independent identically distributed (iid) random variables, which may be represented as  column vectors of real numbers. Define

to be the sample mean with covariance . It can be shown that

where  is the chi-squared distribution with p degrees of freedom.

Two-sample statistic

as the sample means, and

as the respective sample covariance matrices.  Then

is the unbiased pooled covariance matrix estimate (an extension of pooled variance).

Finally, the Hotelling's two-sample t-squared statistic is

Related concepts
It can be related to the F-distribution by

The non-null distribution of this statistic is the noncentral F-distribution (the ratio of a non-central Chi-squared random variable and an independent central Chi-squared random variable) 

with 

where  is the difference vector between the population means.

In the two-variable case, the formula simplifies nicely allowing appreciation of how the correlation, 
between the variables affects . If we define

and 

then

Thus, if the differences in the two rows of the vector  are of the same sign, in general,  becomes smaller as  becomes more positive. If the differences are of opposite sign  becomes larger as  becomes more positive.

A univariate special case can be found in Welch's t-test.

More robust and powerful tests than Hotelling's two-sample test have been proposed in the literature, see for example the interpoint distance based tests which can be applied also when the number of variables is comparable with, or even larger than, the number of subjects.

See also
Student's t-test in univariate statistics
 Student's t-distribution in univariate probability theory
 Multivariate Student distribution
 F-distribution (commonly tabulated or available in software libraries, and hence used for testing the T-squared statistic using the relationship given above)
 Wilks's lambda distribution (in multivariate statistics, Wilks's Λ is to Hotelling's T2 as Snedecor's F is to Student's t in univariate statistics)

References

External links
 

Continuous distributions